"Big Blue World" is the sixth solo single by Paul Haig, and the first single from his second album, The Warp of Pure Fun. It was produced by Haig and former Associates instrumentalist Alan Rankine, and released in the UK and across Europe by Les Disques Du Crepuscule.

One of its B-sides is "Ghost Rider", a cover of the Suicide song, written by Martin Rev and Alan Vega.

Track listing 

 "Big Blue World"
 "Ghost Rider"
 "Endless Song"

References

1984 singles
Paul Haig songs
1984 songs
Songs written by Paul Haig